Git Fresh (formerly known as DeepSide) is an American R&B and hip hop group based in Miami, Florida. They are currently signed to Island Def Jam. The group was initially composed of Rude Boi, Pretty  Sly, Penny, & Mike Ezay.

History

Early years: DeepSide
The group started out and formed when all the band members were in their teenage years, singing at talent shows and parties around the city. With the exception of Pretty Sly, who went to school in Miami, they all went to Dillard Performing Arts School. Rude Boi met Sly at a local talent show in Miami and introduced him to Mike and Penny. There was an immediate chemistry between the guys and they officially formed the group, DeepSide.  Formerly signed to Jive Records, the group  known as DeepSide changed their name after splitting from the label, and all old ties.

Git Fresh
The group changed their name from DeepSide to Git Fresh in 2008. They also have changed record labels from Jive Records to Def Jam. Unfortunately, the singers, Brent "Penny" Pendergast & Mike "Ezay" Espinosa, have reportedly  left the group. As of 2012, It is uncertain if the 2 remaining members will continue as a group.

Discography
2002: DeepSide
2008: Git Fresh 
2011: Eat It Up

Singles
As DeepSide
2002: "Shook"
2002: "Shook" Remix
2003: "Fantaszin'"
2005: "Coochie" (featuring Young Noah & Pety Pablo)
2005: "Hot Like an Oven" (featuring Juvenile)
2006: "Lovely" on the Step Up (Original Soundtrack)
2007: "Let's Make Love" (featuring Papoose)
2007: "What I Need"

As Git Fresh
2008: "Booty Music"
2008: "Like a Women"
2009: "Tipsy" (featuring Rick Ross)
2009: "SwaGG Up" (featuring Jamie Foxx and Rick Ross)
2010: "She Be Like (Bom Bom Bom)" [Available on iTunes now]
2010: "What Them Girls Like" (featuring Flo Rida)
2011: "Eat It Up"
2011: "No Girlfriend"
2011: "Jump Off" (featuring New Boyz)
2012: "Ocho Cinco" (Child Please)
2013: "Leavin with Me"
2015: "Don't You Move"

As featured artist
2010: Flo Rida - "Why You Up in Here" (featuring. Git Fresh, Ludacris, Gucci Mane)
2010: Trina - "White Girl" (featuring. Flo Rida & Git Fresh

References

2001 establishments in Florida
American hip hop groups
Musical groups established in 2001
Musical groups from Miami